Stephen Sphincter was an early Gwar character, played by Ron Curry, who then recorded six albums on SST Records with Hotel X. His on-stage brother was Hans Sphincter, played by drummer Jim Thompson.

References

Gwar members